Alberta Provincial Highway No. 901, commonly referred to as Highway 901, is a  in southern Alberta, Canada that extends Highway 22X from Highway 24 to Highway 1 (Trans-Canada Highway) near Gleichen.

The highway has been receiving an increasing level of traffic, diverting vehicles from Highway 1 east of Gleichen.  Since at least the late 1980s, the current alignment of Highway 901 has been earmarked as a possible new route for the Trans-Canada itself in order to bypass the bulk of Calgary.

Route description 
After intersecting Highway 817, the highway enters the Siksika I.R. No. 146, an Indian reserve of the Siksika Nation, intersecting Highway 547 south of the Hamlet of Gleichen.

Major intersections 
The following is a list of major intersections along Highway 901 from west to east.

References 

901